The Åland convention, refers to two conventions regarding the demilitarization and neutralization of Åland.

 The Åland convention of 1856 was signed on 30 March 1856, following the Russian defeat in the Crimean War against the United Kingdom and France after the Åland War. Russia agreed not to militarise the Åland Islands, which was confirmed by the Treaty of Paris (1856).
However, the Russians militarized the islands in 1916, a move that alarmed the Swedes.
 The Åland convention of 1921 was signed on 20 October 1921 by Sweden, Finland, Germany, United Kingdom, France, Italy, Denmark, Poland, Estonia, and Latvia. See also the Åland Islands dispute.

References

History of Åland
1856 in Sweden
1921 in Sweden
League of Nations treaties
Treaties concluded in 1921
1856 treaties
Treaties of Sweden
Treaties of Finland
Treaties of the Weimar Republic
Treaties of the United Kingdom
Treaties of the French Third Republic
Treaties of the Kingdom of Italy (1861–1946)
Treaties of Denmark
Treaties of the Second Polish Republic
Treaties of Estonia
Treaties of Latvia
Åland law
Treaties extended to Åland